Beche Blade is a sharp-crested ridge rising to  between Murchison Cirque and Arkell Cirque on the south side of the Read Mountains, Shackleton Range. It was photographed from the air by the U.S. Navy, 1967, and surveyed by the British Antarctic Survey, 1968–71. In association with the names of geologists grouped in this area, it was named in 1971 by the UK Antarctic Place-Names Committee  after Sir Henry Thomas de la Beche, English geologist, first Director-General of the Geological Survey of Great Britain (later the Institute of Geological Sciences), 1835–55.

References
 

Ridges of Coats Land